Jerome Hardeman Sneed (February 25, 1864 – March 26, 1950) was an American politician from Texas.

Sneed was born in Collin County on February 25, 1864, and worked as a merchant and teacher. He lived in McKinney, and was elected to the Texas House of Representatives to represent his home county, a part of District 41, in a February 1918 special election to replace Woodville J. Rogers Jr. Sneed was subsequently elected to two consecutive full terms, and left office in January 1923. During his two full terms, Sneed was listed as a Democrat. He died in Dallas on March 26, 1950.

References

1864 births
1950 deaths
19th-century American educators
20th-century American politicians
Schoolteachers from Texas
Democratic Party members of the Texas House of Representatives
People from McKinney, Texas